Ignacio Sosa Ospital (born 31 August 2003) is a Uruguayan professional footballer who plays as a midfielder for Centro Atlético Fénix.

Club career
Sosa is a youth academy graduate of Fénix. He made his professional debut for the club on 3 July 2021 in a 2–1 league win against Cerro Largo.

International career
Sosa is a current Uruguayan youth international. On 23 October 2021, he was named in Uruguay under-20 squad for friendlies against Costa Rica and Honduras.

Career statistics

References

External links
 

Living people
2003 births
Footballers from Montevideo
Association football midfielders
Uruguayan footballers
Uruguayan Primera División players
Centro Atlético Fénix players